Lion tombs (Arabic: مقابر الأسود الدادنية) is an ancient Dadanitic  tombs cut from rock, with over than 20 tombs.

History 
The lion tombs are rock-cut burial niches decorated with reliefs of lions. The tombs are dated back between the 600BCE-500BCE. According to the religious beliefs of the day, the lions protected those buried within the tombs. These tombs are evidence of 2600 years of settlement in al-Ula, originally called Dedan.

Bibliography 
 Said Alsaid, Dedan Treasures of a Spectacular Culture, King Saud University.

References 

Tombs